The University of Knowledge Incorporated was a book publisher located in Chicago, Ilinous, USA in the early-mid 20th century. It produced a series of books known as the Wonder Books in the 1930s and 1940s. The editor in chief was Glenn Frank, B.A., M.A., Litt.D., L.H.D., LL.D.

List of Wonder Books 
 The Earth Before Man - The story of how things began
 The Story of Man - His earliest appearance and development to the portals of history
 The Dawn of Civilization - And life in the ancient East
 Selected Readings -from much loved books
 The Glories of Ancient History
 History From The Renaissance to Napoleon
 The Outline of Modern History
 Outline History of World Literature
 The World we live in and The people we live with travel
 The World we live in & The People we live with - still more travel
 The World we live in & The People we live with - still more travel (Marvels of Asia and the Orient)
 Great Leaders -Men and women who influenced their times
 Great Inventors and Their Inventions
 The Story of Engineering
 Wonders of Modern Industry - The story of the machine age
 Music and the Great Composers - The story of musical expression
 Trailing Animals Around The World
 Earth and Sky - Wonders of the universe
 Exploring The Mysteries of Physics and Chemistry
 The Story of Living Plants, Their Uses and how they grow
 An Outline History of Art - The Key to Parnassus
 An Outline History of Art - Art of the Middle Ages in Europe of Islam, in the Far East, and of the American Indians
 An Outline History of Art - Art of the European Renaissance, Baroque, and Modern Art
 A Modern Book of Wonders - Amazing Facts in a remarkable world

References 

Publishing